John Innes Watson (24 June 1906–1973) was a Scottish footballer who played in the Football League for Hull City.

References

1906 births
1973 deaths
Scottish footballers
Association football midfielders
English Football League players
Hull City A.F.C. players